Kariat Arekmane  ( Arabic: لربع ؤركمام / قرية أركمان, Tamaziġt:  Larbaa Orekmam , Raba3 Nwachman or Chebdan) is a town in Nador Province, Oriental, Morocco. According to the 2004 census it has a population of 5,266.

References

Populated places in Oriental (Morocco)